Sebastian Roché is a Scottish-French actor and writer. His extensive television credits also include roles in Fringe, The Vampire Diaries, The Originals, Supernatural, Criminal Minds, Once Upon a Time, Grimm, Scandal, NCIS: Los Angeles, The Young Pope, The Man in the High Castle, and Genius.

Roché's stage credits include the Broadway productions of Salome and The Green Bird, and the West End production of Tartuffe. He has starred in the films The Last of the Mohicans (1992), The Peacemaker (1997), 15 Minutes (2001), Sorry, Haters (2005), The Namesake (2006), Beowulf (2007), Happy Tears (2009), The Adventures of Tintin (2011), Safe House (2012), Wer (2013), A Walk Among the Tombstones (2014), and We Love You, Sally Carmichael! (2017).

Film

Television

Stage

Video games

References

External links
 
 
 
 

Male actor filmographies
British filmographies
Scottish filmographies
French filmographies